The Hair and Skin Trading Company is a British drone / avant-noise group formed in 1991 by ex-Loop members Neil Mackay (vocals/bass) and John Wills (drums). Joined by Nigel Webb (Guitars) and Richard Johnston on samples (who left as a band member during the recording of the first album, but periodically collaborated as a live engineer adding live dub to their sound and whose samples also appear on Psychedelische Musique uncredited), they released their debut album Jo in Nine G Hell on Beggars Banquet Records in 1992.  They also played the Reading Festival that year, with tours of Europe, US and the UK, following their subsequent releases - with shows at CBGB's and the Knitting Factory, New York &  Festivals such as  C.M.J - New York, Roskilde Festival, Denmark and Phoenix Festival, United Kingdom.

Their first two albums bear influences of My Bloody Valentine and The Skids, while the vocal delivery has been compared to The Fall's Mark E Smith. By the third album, 1995's Faust-like Psychedelische Musique, the band had dispensed with conventional rock elements, and few of its songs bear titles; they are instead denoted by either letters or symbols.

They released their fourth album on 1 September 2019, I Don't Know Where You Get Those Funny Ideas From on Escape Velocity / Bandcamp, having released a new track "Nihil" on 12 October 2018 on the Music 2 Heal The Earth compilation album (Farmadelica Sound).

Wills now records and performs as Pumajaw.  Mackay formed a band with his then wife Kim Hannibal called Juicy Eureka and released an album for Lissy's Records titled Making Things Up and Then Forgetting Them.  Mackay and Webb played several gigs around London with Tony Irving in a free noise / jazz band called Unity Gain, releasing a lathe cut LP in January 2014 titled Sounds from the Room. Webb continues to make music under the name Micro / Nigel Webb and Digital Signal Recordings with a number of new projects in progress.

Discography
 Ground Zero [EP Situation Two] – 1992
 Jo in Nine G Hell [Album -Vinyl, CD, Cassette, Download - Situation Two, Alpha Japan]  – 1992
 Over Valence [Album-Vinyl, CD, Cassette, Download Beggars Banquet] – 1993
 Loa [single, Clear Vinyl, CD Beggars Banquet] – 1993
 Go round [EP] [vinyl, CD- Beggars Banquet] – 1993
 K-Funk [flexi 7" single w/Pram Too Pure/Beggars Banquet] – 1993
 Deafening Divinities With Aural Affinities [compilation Beggars Banquet] – 1993
 Emission 002 [compilation Labels France] – 1993
 Beggars Banquet The Singles Collection [compilation Beggars Banquet] – 1994
 Monsters, Robots and Bug Men- A User's Guide To The Rock Hinterland [Virgin Records compilation] – 1996
 Psychedelische Musique (Lava Surf Kunst) [Album Vinyl, CD, Freek Records] – 1995
 Brighton/Highbury/Brixton/Crouch End [EP - Aquese Recordings] – 1996
 Music2 Heal the Earth [compilation Farmadelica Sound] – 2018
 I Don't Know Where You Get Those Funny Ideas From – 2019

References

English post-rock groups
English noise rock groups
Situation Two artists
Beggars Banquet Records artists